Isabella of Scotland (1195–after October 1263), also known as Isobel or Isabel, was a daughter of William the Lion, King of Scotland and his wife Ermengarde de Beaumont. She was a member of the House of Dunkeld and by marriage she was Countess of Norfolk.

Early life
Isabella was born in 1195 and was the second of four children born to her father by his marriage. Her older sister was Margaret, Countess of Kent, her younger brother was Alexander II of Scotland and her younger sister was Marjorie, Countess of Pembroke. Isabella also had many illegitimate half-siblings from her father.

Her father had battled with Henry II of England as well as his younger son John of England. As a result, in 1209, William was forced to send Isabella and Margaret as hostages; they were imprisoned at Corfe Castle along with Eleanor, Fair Maid of Brittany, who had been under house arrest to prevent her claim on England. Isabella was only fourteen at the time of her imprisonment. In June 1213, John sent green robes, lambskin-trimmed cloaks, and summer slippers to the three royal ladies. The ladies were sometimes allowed to ride out under the strictest guard.

Marriage
Upon Isabella's release, she was required to marry English noble Roger Bigod, 4th Earl of Norfolk. All of the sisters married English nobility whilst Alexander was required to marry Princess Joan, daughter of King John. Roger was roughly fourteen years Isabella's junior. Henry III of England granted her property when she married Roger in May 1225. Roger became a ward of his new brother-in-law King Alexander; he held the position until 1228.

Isabella was second-in-line to the Scottish throne (after her sister Margaret) until 1227 when Margaret's daughter and namesake was born. By 1241 she was fourth in line upon the birth of her nephew Prince Alexander.

Roger and Isabella were childless. In 1245, Roger repudiated her on grounds of consanguinity, but was compelled by an ecclesiastical sentence to take Isabella back in 1253. She is called "filiam regis Scotiæ" (but not named) by Matthew Paris when he recorded her husband's resumption of their marriage.

It is unknown when Isabella died, she appeared to have been living in Gloucestershire in October 1263; there is no mention of her after this. She was buried at the Church of the Black Friars, London. Roger died in 1270 and was succeeded by their nephew Roger Bigod, 5th Earl of Norfolk.

King William's legitimate line through his four children became extinct by 1290, leading to a Succession crisis.

Ancestry

References

1195 births
Isabella
Scottish princesses
Norfolk
Year of death unknown
Burials at the Church of the Black Friars, London
13th-century Scottish women
13th-century Scottish people
13th-century English women
13th-century English people
Daughters of kings